Kate Collins (born 7 April 1986 in Mount Gambier, South Australia) is an Australian journalist.

Collins currently presents Nine News Adelaide with Brenton Ragless.

Career
Collins studied at Norwood Morialta High School, and later the University of Adelaide, and the University of South Australia. She has also worked as a weekend newsreader at Austereo Radio. She began training as a presenter at C31 Adelaide.

She joined NWS 9 in Adelaide in 2006 as a general reporter for Nine News, and in 2007 began acting as fill-in news presenter on weekends. She replaced Rob Kelvin in 2011.

Collins was formerly the presenter of the now-defunct Adelaide edition of A Current Affair.

Personal life
In August 2014, Collins announced that she was pregnant with her first child and in February 2015 gave birth to a baby boy Harvey. In January 2018, Collins welcomed her second child Eddie.

References

Nine News presenters
Journalists from South Australia
People from Mount Gambier, South Australia
Writers from Adelaide
1983 births
Living people